The following list includes notable people who were born or have lived in Ottawa, Illinois. For a similar list organized alphabetically by last name, see the category page People from Ottawa, Illinois.

Academics and scientists

Arts and culture

Crime

Military

Medicine and academia

Politics and law

Sports

Baseball

Football

Golf

References

 
Ottawa
Ottawa